Grilly is a commune in the Ain department in eastern France.

Population

History

Jean I de Grailly was born at Grilly near Gex on the shores of Lac Léman  in the County of Savoy. He probably travelled to England during the reign of Henry III of England in the entourage of Peter II of Savoy, In 1262 he was already a knight in the household of Prince Edward, the king's heir and future King Edward I of England. In 1263 he had attained the status of a counsellor of the young prince. He was made Edward's Seneschal in Gascony from 1278.
In 1279, Jean travelled to Amiens and to England to negotiate the Treaty of Amiens, which ended the state of war between Edward of England and Philip III of France and returned the Agenais to English control. Jean de Grailly eventually fell short of funds for his activities, since his expenses need approval from the Exchequer before he could receive his salary. He took to exploitation and illegal exactions from the peasants, whose complaints eventually reached the ears of Edward I. He was removed from office sometime between June 1286 and Spring 1287. Led a French force alongside the English led by Otto de Grandson at the Fall of Acre in 1291.

See also
Communes of the Ain department

References

Communes of Ain
Ain communes articles needing translation from French Wikipedia